WHVN is the second studio album by the heavy metal band Will Haven, released on September 14, 1999. In 2021, it was named one of the 20 best metal albums of 1999 by Metal Hammer magazine.

Track listing
All tracks written by Will Haven, except where noted.
 "Fresno" – 5:31
 "If She Could Speak" – 3:08
 "Jaworski" – 2:35
 "Slopez" – 7:09
 "End Summary" – 2:50
 "Subtitles" – 1:11 (Stenman)
 "Genesis 11" – 3:34
 "Dallass Drake" – 4:00
 "Death Do Us Part" – 5:12
 "Muse" – 3:25
 "Miguel Abburido" – 8:45
 "I've Seen My Fate (Appliance Remix)" – 5:41
 "Sign Off" – 4:20

Personnel

Band members

 Grady Avenell – vocals
 Jeff Irwin – guitar and piano
 Mike Martin – bass guitar
 Wayne Morse – drums

Other personnel

Adam Federico – drum circle on "Slopez"
Jeff Jaworski – backing vocals on "Jaworski"
Eric Stenman – production, engineering and programming
Charlie Watts – mastering
Jennifer Woodruff – additional vocals on "Slopez"

References

Will Haven albums
1999 albums
Music for Nations albums